Haldor Topsøe may refer to:

Haldor Topsøe (1842–1935), Danish chemist and crystallographer
Haldor Topsøe (1913–2013), Danish engineer
Haldor Topsøe (company), Danish catalysis company founded in 1940 by Haldor Topsøe (1913–2013)